Louisa County is a county located in the Commonwealth of Virginia. As of the 2020 census, the population was 37,596. The county seat is Louisa.

History 

Prior to colonial settlement, the area comprising Louisa County was occupied by several indigenous peoples including the Tutelo, the Monacan, and the Manahoac peoples, who eventually fled to join the Cayuga Iroquois (Haudenosaunee) people in New York state under pressure from English settlers.

Louisa County was established in 1742 from Hanover County. The county is named for Princess Louise of Great Britain, youngest daughter of King George II, and wife of King Frederick V of Denmark.

Patrick Henry lived for some time in Louisa County on Roundabout Creek in 1764. Henry was being mentored at that time by the Louisa County magnate Thomas Johnson the representative of Louisa County in the House of Burgesses. In 1765, Patrick Henry won his first election to represent Louisa County in the House of Burgesses.  At the end of the eighteenth century and in the early nineteenth century, numerous free mixed-race families migrated together from here to Kentucky, where neighbors began to identify them as Melungeon. 

The Virginia Central Railroad was completed through Louisa County in 1838–1840.  During the Civil War, it was an important supply line for the Confederate armies. As a result, several significant cavalry actions took place in the county, particularly one fought at Trevilians in 1864.

20th century to present

The Twin Oaks Community is one of the country's oldest secular communes, established by its first eight members in 1967. This was part of a national movement among numerous young people to "get back to the land" and live in more simple ways based in community. Louisa is also home to the Acorn Community, a rural, cooperative, income sharing community on about 80 acres, founded in 1993 by one of the founding members of Twin Oaks, Kat Kincade. Another newly forming community as of 2011 is the Living Energy Farm, a 'neo-Amish' farm, where no fossil fuels will be used but new technologies such as solar will be embraced.

Lake Anna, a  artificial lake, and the associated North Anna Nuclear Generating Station were built by Virginia Power in the 1970s.  In recent years the predominantly rural county has grown because of retirees' settling near Lake Anna, and because of its convenient location for commuters.  It is an hour's drive or less from Richmond, Fredericksburg and Charlottesville.

For a discussion and additional information on Louisa County history, see: Louisa County Historical Notes.

2011 earthquake

The U.S. Geological Survey reported that a magnitude 5.8 earthquake hit Virginia on Tuesday, August 23, 2011, at 1:51 PM EST. The quake occurred at an approximate depth of 3.7 miles and was centered in Louisa County (location at 37.944°N, 77.942°W), 5 miles SSW of Mineral and 38 miles NW of Richmond. According to Associated Press, "Shaking was felt at the White House and all over the East Coast, as far south as Charleston, S.C. Parts of the Pentagon, White House and Capitol were evacuated." It  was also felt in parts of Canada.

Damage totals in Louisa County totaled over $70 million:
 $57.5 million in damages to public school structures
 $11.5 million in damages to residential structures
 $400,000 in damages to religious structures
 $400,000 in damages to commercial structures
 $500,000 in damages to government structures

Geography

Adjacent counties
 Orange County – north
 Spotsylvania County – northeast
 Hanover County – east
 Goochland County – south
 Fluvanna County – southwest
 Albemarle County – west

Major highways

Demographics

2020 census

Note: the US Census treats Hispanic/Latino as an ethnic category. This table excludes Latinos from the racial categories and assigns them to a separate category. Hispanics/Latinos can be of any race.

2000 Census
As of the census of 2000, there were 25,627 people, 9,945 households, and 7,259 families residing in the county.  The population density was 52 people per square mile (20/km2).  There were 11,855 housing units at an average density of 24 per square mile (9/km2).  The racial makeup of the county was 50.96% White, 46.58% Black  or African American, 0.42% Native American, 0.25% Asian, 0.01% Pacific Islander, 0.18% from other races, and 1.01% from two or more races.  0.71% of the population were Hispanic or Latino of any race.

There were 9,945 households, out of which 31.20% had children under the age of 18 living with them, 57.30% were married couples living together, 10.80% had a female householder with no husband present, and 27.00% were non-families. 22.10% of all households were made up of individuals, and 9.00% had someone living alone who was 65 years of age or older.  The average household size was 2.56 and the average family size was 2.97.

In the county, the population was spread out, with 24.40% under the age of 18, 6.60% from 18 to 24, 29.90% from 25 to 44, 26.20% from 45 to 64, and 12.90% who were 65 years of age or older.  The median age was 39 years. For every 100 females, there were 96.90 males.  For every 100 females age 18 and over, there were 94.90 males.

The median income for a household in the county was $39,402, and the median income for a family was $44,722. Males had a median income of $31,764 versus $24,826 for females. The per capita income for the county was $19,479.  About 7.10% of families and 10.20% of the population were below the poverty line, including 13.00% of those under age 18 and 12.50% of those age 65 or over.

Although the county's 2008 population is only 31,000, it is one of the fastest-growing in Virginia, as people have moved near Lake Anna. At least 15 new housing developments have sprouted in five years.

Communities

Towns
 Louisa
 Mineral

Census-designated place
 Blue Ridge Shores

Other unincorporated communities

 Apple Grove
 Bumpass
 Cuckoo
 Ferncliff
 Gum Spring
 Holly Grove
 Orchid
 Twin Oaks Community
 Trevilians
 Yanceyville
 Zion Crossroads

Historical places and points of interest
 Green Springs Historic District
 Jerdone Castle
 Lake Anna
 Twin Oaks Community, a secular commune, is located in Louisa County.
 Acorn Community, another income sharing community in the county, which runs the Southern Exposure Seed Exchange business as its principal source of income.

Notable people
 James Waddel Alexander (1804–1859), born in Louisa County, noted Presbyterian minister and professor at Princeton Theological Seminary
 Arthur P. Bagby (1794–1858), born in Louisa County, tenth Governor of Alabama from 1837 to 1841.
 Henry "Box" Brown (c.1816–after 1889), a slave who escaped to freedom by having himself mailed in a wooden crate to Pennsylvanian abolitionists.
 Paxus Calta (b. 1957), anti-nuclear activist, blogger and member of Twin Oaks Community and Acorn Community.
 Dabney Carr (1743–1773), celebrated Louisa County patriot.
 Patrick Henry (1736–1799), at Roundabout Plantation, eight miles southwest of Louisa Court House, Patrick Henry lived in Louisa County from 1765 to 1768, when he sat for Louisa County in the House of Burgesses. This was the beginning of his political career.
 Charles W. Kent (1860-1917), English scholar
 Charles Henry Langston (1817–1892), born free and of mixed racial ancestry, one of two men tried and convicted after Oberlin-Wellington Rescue, abolitionist and political activist in Ohio and Kansas.
 John Mercer Langston (1829–1899), abolitionist, activist, educator and politician; in 1855 first black person in Ohio elected to public office, first dean of Howard University law school, first president of Virginia State University, in 1888 first black person to be elected to the United States Congress from Virginia.
 Flora Molton (1908–1990), singer.
 John Overton (1766–1833), born in Louisa County, notable political leader who was an adviser to Andrew Jackson and co-founder of Memphis, Tennessee.
 James Waddel (1739–1805), celebrated Presbyterian preacher

Politics

See also
 National Register of Historic Places listings in Louisa County, Virginia

References

External links 

 Official Louisa County Website
  The Healthy Living Directory
 Louisa County VAGenWeb Genealogy Project
 2014 Fresh Air piece (audio here) and Atlantic article on a sexting scandal in Louisa County

 
Virginia counties
1742 establishments in Virginia
Greater Richmond Region